The 2017–18 Little Rock Trojans women's basketball team represents the University of Arkansas at Little Rock during the 2017–18 NCAA Division I women's basketball season. The Trojans, led by fifteenth year head coach Joe Foley, play their home games at the Jack Stephens Center and were members of the Sun Belt Conference. They finished the season 23–10, 17–1 in Sun Belt play to win the Sun Belt regular season and tournament titles to earn an automatic trip to the NCAA women's tournament where they lost in the first round to Florida State.

Previous season
They finished the season 25–9, 17–1 in Sun Belt play to win the Sun Belt regular season title. They advanced to the semifinals of the Sun Belt women's tournament where they lost to Louisiana–Lafayette. They received an automatic bid to the WNIT where defeated Southern Miss in the first round before losing to Alabama in the second round.

Roster

Schedule

 
|-
!colspan=9 style=| Non-conference regular season

|-
!colspan=9 style=| Sun Belt Conference regular season

|-
!colspan=9 style=| Sun Belt Women's Tournament

|-
!colspan=9 style=| NCAA Women's Tournament

Rankings
2017–18 NCAA Division I women's basketball rankings

See also
 2017–18 Little Rock Trojans men's basketball team

References

Little Rock Trojans women's basketball seasons
Little Rock
Little Rock